The Foundation George Mosse Fund of the University of Amsterdam (Stichting George Mosse Fonds van de Universiteit van Amsterdam) is a Dutch foundation (stichting) that aims to promote gay and lesbian studies. It was founded in 2001 at the University of Amsterdam, with a bequest from George Mosse's inheritance, given out of appreciation for the cultural-historical education and research on homosexuality in Amsterdam. The foundation is known primarily for its Mosse Lectures and its QueerTalk events.

Mosse Lectures

An initiative of the George Mosse Fund, the Mosse Lectures is a series of public lectures held annually in Amsterdam, organized by the George Mosse Fund, in collaboration with IHLIA. The series was inaugurated by Hafid Bouazza, a Moroccan-Dutch writer.

See also

 List of public lecture series
 LGBT history in the Netherlands

References

External links
 

Annual events in the Netherlands
Foundations based in the Netherlands
Lecture series
2001 establishments in the Netherlands
University of Amsterdam
LGBT organisations in the Netherlands